Columnar jointing is a geological structure where sets of intersecting closely spaced fractures, referred to as joints, result in the formation of a regular array of polygonal prisms, or columns. Columnar jointing occurs in many types of igneous rocks and forms as the rock cools and contracts. Columnar jointing can occur in cooling lava flows and ashflow tuffs (ignimbrites), as well as in some shallow intrusions. Columnar jointing also occurs rarely in sedimentary rocks if they have been heated by nearby hot magma.

The columns can vary from 3 meters to a few centimeters in diameter, and can be as much as 30 meters tall. They are typically parallel and straight, but can also be curved and vary in diameter. An array of regular, straight, and larger-diameter columns is called a colonnade; an irregular, less-straight, and smaller-diameter array is termed an entablature. The number of sides of the individual columns can vary from 3 to 8, with 6 sides being the most common.

Places

Some famous locations in the United States where columnar jointing can be found are the Devils Tower in Wyoming, the Devils Postpile in California and the Columbia River flood basalts in Oregon, Washington and Idaho. Other famous places include the Giant's Causeway in Northern Ireland and Fingal's Cave on the island of Staffa, Scotland.

Devils Tower

Geologists agree that the rock forming the Devils Tower solidified from an intrusion but it has not been established whether the magma from this intrusion ever reached the surface. Most columns are 6-sided, but 4, 5, and 7-sided ones can also be found.

Giant's Causeway

The Giant's Causeway (Irish: Clochán An Aifir) on the north Antrim coast of Northern Ireland was created by volcanic activity 60 million years ago, and consists of over 40,000 columns. According to a legend, the giant Finn McCool created the Giant's Causeway, as a causeway to Scotland.

Sōunkyō Gorge

Sōunkyō Gorge, a part of the town of Kamikawa, Hokkaido, Japan, features a 24-kilometer stretch of columnar jointing, which is the result of an eruption of the Daisetsuzan Volcanic Group 30,000 years ago.

Deccan Traps

The late Cretaceous Deccan Traps of India constitute one of the largest volcanic provinces of Earth, and examples of columnar jointing can be found in St. Mary's Island in the state of Karnataka.

High Island Reservoir 
Formed in Cretaceous, the columnar rocks are found around the reservoir and the islands nearby in Sai Kung, Hong Kong. It is special that the rocks are not mafic, but felsic tuff instead.

Makhtesh Ramon
The columnar jointed sandstone of the HaMinsara (Carpentry Shop) in the makhtesh (erosion cirque) of Makhtesh Ramon, Negev desert, Israel.

Cerro Kõi
There are several examples of columnar jointed sandstones in the greater Asunción region of Paraguay. The best known is Cerro Kõi in Areguá, but there are also several quarries in Luque.

Mars

Several exposures of columnar jointing have been discovered on the planet Mars by the High Resolution Imaging Science Experiment (HiRISE) camera, which is carried by the Mars Reconnaissance Orbiter (MRO).

Sawn Rocks

Sawn Rocks, in Mount Kaputar National Park close to Narrabri, New South Wales, Australia, features 40 meters of columnar jointing above the creek and 30 meters below the surface.

Basaltic Prisms of Santa María Regla

Alexander von Humboldt documented the prisms located in Huasca de Ocampo, in the Mexican state of Hidalgo.

Columnar basalt of Tawau (Batu Bersusun)
At Kampung Balung Cocos, Tawau, Malaysia, the river flows through the area of columnar basalt. One section is seen vertically high on river bank. The rest lies on river bank. The water flows from the lowest area forming waterfall.

See also
Basalt fan structure
Prism (geology)
Honeycomb conjecture

References

External links 
Aydin, A., and J. Zhong  (nda) Columnar Joints, Multiple Joint Sets,  Rock Fracture Knolwedgebase, Stanford University, Stanford, California.

Igneous rocks
Geomorphology
Structural geology
 
Metamorphic rocks